Lowell is an unincorporated community in Idaho County, Idaho, United States, located at the confluence of the Selway and Lochsa rivers, where they join to form the Middle Fork of the Clearwater River.

U.S. Route 12 is the only major highway to serve the community, and occupies the north bank of the Lochsa (and Clearwater). Lowell is between the three rivers, and is accessed by a bridge over the terminus of the Lochsa on Selway Road. The population of Lowell is 30, and there are several motels, resorts, and campgrounds that swell the population seasonally.

Climate
This region experiences warm (but not hot) and dry summers, with no average monthly temperatures above 71.6 °F.  According to the Köppen Climate Classification system, Lowell has a warm-summer Mediterranean climate, abbreviated "Csb" on climate maps.

References

External links

Unincorporated communities in Idaho
Unincorporated communities in Idaho County, Idaho